Joel Silbersher is a musician from Melbourne, Australia, who was the singer and guitar player for rock and roll band, GOD (1986–1989). GOD had a minor but enduring hit with "My Pal," a song written by Silbersher. Since its release in 1988, "My Pal" has been covered by bands such as Dinosaur Jr, Magic Dirt, Violent Soho, Bonnie Prince Billy, Tide of Iron and Peabody. At the closing of Melbourne's Tote Hotel, Silbersher and The Drones played "My Pal" as the final song.

Silbersher released Tendrils with Charlie Owen in 1995. The duo released Soaking Red as Tendrils in 1998.

Silbersher released the solo album Greasy Lens on King Crab Records in October 2002.

Discography

Albums

Awards and nominations

ARIA Music Awards
The ARIA Music Awards is an annual awards ceremony that recognises excellence, innovation, and achievement across all genres of Australian music. They commenced in 1987.

! 
|-
|1999
| Soaking Red (as Tendrils)
| ARIA Award for Best Adult Alternative Album
| 
|
|-

References

General
  Note: Archived [on-line] copy has limited functionality.
  Note: [on-line] version established at White Room Electronic Publishing Pty Ltd in 2007 and was expanded from the 2002 edition.

Specific

External links
Hoss at MySpace

1971 births
Living people
Musicians from Melbourne
20th-century Australian musicians
Australian guitarists